All That for This is the second studio album from American singer-songwriter Crystal Bowersox. It was released on March 19, 2013 by Shanachie Records. The album features a duet with Jakob Dylan.

Background
Bowersox describes the album as, "There are definitely more happier light-hearted moments on this record." "There are also touches of some of the darkest places and emotional states that I've been in my past. This album reveals a much more grateful and gracious side of me. It's the next chapter of my life."

Singles
The first single from the album is "Dead Weight". It debuted on On Air with Ryan Seacrest on February 5, 2013.

Track listing

Personnel
Crystal Bowersox - vocals, acoustic guitar, background vocals, songwriting
Paul Rigby - guitar, mandolin
Dave Depper - bass
Scott McPherson - drums
Asher Fulero - keyboards
Jesse Brooke - percussion
Jakob Dylan - vocals
Mark 'Speedy' Gonzales - trombone
Gilbert Elorreaga - trumpet
Josh Levy - baritone sax
Joel Guzman - accordion
Jans Ingber - congas, background vocals
Steve Berlin - midisax

Release history

References

External links
 

2013 albums
Shanachie Records albums
Crystal Bowersox albums